Patterson Kaboré (born 5 May 1990) is a Burkinabé professional footballer who plays as a right back for Kingston Stockade FC in the National Premier Soccer League.

Club career
Born in Ouagadougou, Kaboré finished his formation with Ivorian club Jeunesse Club d'Abidjan. After a short spell with JC de Bobo Dioulasso, he moved to Spain through Promoesport, and signed a contract with UD Almería.

Initially assigned to the reserves, Kaboré failed to make an appearance for the side and subsequently served loan stints at Tercera División sides CD Comarca de Níjar, SD Órdenes and Terrassa FC. Upon returning, he cut ties with the Andalusians and spent roughly a year without a club.

In October 2013, Kaboré joined La Roda CF in Segunda División B. In January 2015, after being rarely used during the season, he moved to CD Madridejos in the fourth level.

In 2016, Kaboré moved to Georgia and signed for FC Guria Lanchkhuti. In late January 2017 he returned to Spain after agreeing to a contract with CD Eldense.

International career
On 13 March 2017, Kaboré was called up to the Burkina Faso national team for a friendly match with Nigeria. He made his debut eleven days later, starting in a 0–2 loss against Morocco.

References

External links

1990 births
Living people
Sportspeople from Ouagadougou
Burkinabé footballers
Association football defenders
Segunda División B players
Tercera División players
UD Almería B players
Terrassa FC footballers
CD Eldense footballers
Erovnuli Liga players
FC Guria Lanchkhuti players
Burkina Faso international footballers
Burkinabé expatriate footballers
Burkinabé expatriate sportspeople in Ivory Coast
Burkinabé expatriate sportspeople in Spain
Expatriate footballers in Ivory Coast
Expatriate footballers in Spain
Expatriate footballers in Georgia (country)
La Roda CF players
21st-century Burkinabé people